The 1988 Northwestern Wildcats football team represented Northwestern University during the 1988 NCAA Division I-A football season. They participated as members of the Big Ten Conference and played their home games at Dyche Stadium in Evanston, Illinois. They were coached by Francis Peay.

Schedule

References

Northwestern
Northwestern Wildcats football seasons
Northwestern Wildcats football